Ta Khmao station is a terminus station on Line 02 of the Phnom Penh BRT bus rapid transit network in Phnom Penh, Cambodia, located on Monivong Boulevard. It is located outside of the TaKhmao Market.

It is 12km from the Choeung Ek Genocidal Centre.

See also
 Phnom Penh City Bus
 Transport in Phnom Penh
 Line 02 (Phnom Penh Bus Rapid Transit)

External links
 Official Page of Phnom Penh Municipal Bus Services

Phnom Penh Bus Rapid Transit stations